Lucas Benamo (born February 19, 1985) is an Argentine racing driver. He is a former winner of the Argentine Formula Renault 1.6 Championship, winning it in 2005 having been runner-up the season before.

Career 
2001: Formula Renault Argentina
2002: Formula Renault Argentina
2003: Formula Renault Argentina
2004: Formula Renault Argentina, Runner-up
2005: Formula Renault Argentina, Champion
2006: TC2000 (Renault Megane), Renault TC2000 Team
2007: TC2000 (Honda Civic)

References 

Argentine racing drivers
1985 births
Living people
Italian Formula Renault 2.0 drivers
TC 2000 Championship drivers
Formula Renault Argentina drivers
Súper TC 2000 drivers

Jenzer Motorsport drivers